Hernandia is a genus of flowering plants in the family Hernandiaceae. It was named after the Spanish botanist Francisco Hernández de Toledo.

Species
, Plants of the World Online accepted the following species:
 Hernandia albiflora (C.T.White) Kubitzki – northeast Queensland
 Hernandia beninensis Welw. ex Henriq. – São Tomé
 Hernandia bivalvis Benth. – eastern Queensland
 Hernandia catalpifolia Britton & Harris – Jamaica
 Hernandia cordigera Vieill. – New Caledonia
 Hernandia cubensis Griseb. – Cuba
 Hernandia didymantha Donn.Sm. – southern Mexico (Chiapas), Central America, Colombia, and Ecuador
 Hernandia drakeana Nadeaud – Society Islands (Moorea)
 Hernandia guianensis Aubl. – Trinidad, Venezuela, the Guianas, and northern Brazil
 Hernandia hammelii D'Arcy – Panama
 Hernandia jamaicensis Britton & Harris – Jamaica
 Hernandia kunstleri King ex K.Heyne
 Hernandia labyrinthica Tuyama – New Guinea, Solomon Islands, and Marianas
Hernandia leucomphala (Hoffmanns.) Steud.
 Hernandia lychnifera Grayum & N.Zamora – Ecuador
 Hernandia mascarenensis (Meisn.) Kubitzki – Mauritius and Réunion
 Hernandia moerenhoutiana Guill. – Bismarck Archipelago, Solomon Islands, Vanuatu, Fiji, Tonga, Samoan Islands, Society Islands, Tubuai Islands, Niue, and Wallis and Futuna
 Hernandia nukuhivensis F.Br. – Marquesas Islands
 Hernandia nymphaeifolia (C.Presl) Kubitzki – Madagascar, Indian Ocean islands, Sri Lanka, Indochina, Indonesia, New Guinea, Australia (Northern Territory and Queensland), and South Pacific
 Hernandia obovata O.C.Schmidt – Haiti
 Hernandia olivacea Gillespie – Fiji
 Hernandia ovigera L. – Nicobar Islands, Myanmar, Indonesia, Philippines, New Guinea, and South Pacific
 Hernandia papuana C.T.White
 Hernandia rostrata Kubitzki – Solomon Islands
 Hernandia samoensis Hochr.
 Hernandia sonora L. – Mexico and the Caribbean islands
 Hernandia stenura Standl. – southern Mexico, Central America, and Colombia
 Hernandia stokesii (F.Br.) Kubitzki 
 Hernandia temarii Nadeaud – Society Islands (Tahiti)
 Hernandia voyronii Jum. – Madagascar
 Hernandia wendtii Espejo – central Mexico to Honduras

References

External links

 Taxonomy
 Hernandiaceae at the University of Hawaii
 links at CSDL, Texas
 Vegetation of the Montane Region of Savai'i, W. Arthur Whistler.
 PPP-Index Pflanzerneinkaufsfürer für Europa 

Hernandiaceae